Peter Marshall (born 11 April 1945 in Derry, Northern Ireland) is a British broadcaster. He was educated at St. Columb's College in Derry.

Broadcasting career

Television
He became an announcer at Ulster Television, in 1967, and moved to Anglia Television in 1970. After a brief spell at Southern Television, he became well known as an in-vision announcer for Thames Television from 1976, also announcing during this period for ATV and HTV West, and presenting a weekend show on BBC Radio 2. He remained a Thames announcer until the company ceased broadcasting as an ITV contractor, announcing on its final day (31 December 1992) although by then he was not seen in vision.

For a long period in the 1970s and 1980s he co-hosted the Miss United Kingdom beauty pageant with Judith Chalmers, and the Miss World beauty pageant (alongside Alexandra Bastedo on one occasion). He also contributed to the Thames Television travel show Wish You Were Here...? (also fronted by Chalmers). he was Arts Editor for HTV Wales and presented News & consumer shows. In 1989, he also hosted the first UK revival of Sale of the Century, on the fledgling Sky TV satellite network. As well as hosting the Sale of the Century revival, Marshall had also worked in 1971 as the announcer on the original version of the show (hosted by Nicholas Parsons) before being replaced in season two by John Benson.

In 1994, he was behind the cameras (once again working for Thames) when he produced the first series of Infatuation UK, starring American emcee Bob Eubanks, for UK satellite station Living TV.

Radio
Marshall worked as a radio presenter with the BBC, and spent several years as host of the evening show on Melody FM in London.

Other work
He is now the founder/owner of Eccentric Multimedia Ltd.

External links

1945 births
Living people
British radio DJs
British game show hosts
Radio and television announcers
Beauty pageant hosts